Katrine Linda Mathilda Marçal (née Kielos; born 24 October 1983) is a Swedish writer, journalist and correspondent for Swedish daily newspaper Dagens Nyheter.

Biography
Marçal earlier served as chief editorialist of the Swedish newspaper Aftonbladet where she mainly wrote articles about Swedish and international financial politics and feminism. She has a Bachelor's degree from Uppsala universitet and has also been a freelance writer for Expressens culture page. In 2013, the Swedish newspaper Dagens Nyheter awarded Marçal the third annual Lagercrantzen prize for critics. She received the Jolo-prize for journalism in 2015.

Marçal's book Det enda könet ("The only sex", in Swedish), which discusses the relationship between economics and patriarchy, was nominated for the August Prize in 2012. An English translation by Saskia Vogel was published in the United Kingdom under the title Who Cooked Adam Smith's Dinner?. The book has since been translated to 20 languages. Margaret Atwood called it “A smart, funny, readable book on economics, money [and] women.”.

In 2015, she was listed as one of BBC's 100 Women.

Marçal has interviewed leading economists and investors like Nassim Nicholas Taleb and Steve Eisman as part of her work for the Swedish financial news channel EFN. Her interview with former Greek finance minister Yanis Varoufakis about the European debt crisis has been viewed more than 1 million times on YouTube.

Personal life

It was reported in 2012 that she was living in Hertfordshire, England. Since 2014, she has been married to British garden designer Guy Marçal, from whom she took her current surname.

Bibliography
 2012 – Det enda könet (Who Cooked Adam Smith's Dinner?) 
 2021 – Mother of Invention: How Good Ideas Get Ignored in an Economy Built for Men  English edition of Att uppfinna världen

References and sources

External links

 http://www.litteraturmagazinet.se/katrine-kielos
 http://www.pitea-tidningen.se/kultur/artikel.aspx?ArticleId=3850017 
 http://mobil.aftonbladet.se/kultur/bokrecensioner/article14860947.ab?partner=www
 http://www.arenauniversitetet.se/forelasare/

1983 births
Swedish journalists
Swedish women writers
Swedish people of Polish descent
Swedish-language writers
Living people
People from Lund
Radical feminists
BBC 100 Women
Dagens Nyheter journalists
Uppsala University alumni